Aurora Ponselé (born 4 April 1992) is an Italian open water swimmer who won bronze medal at the European Championships on 10 km.

Biography
Ponselé also competed swimming in pool, where she won a silver medal on 800 metres freestyle at the 2013 Mediterranean Games.

Achievements

References

External links
 

1992 births
Living people
Italian female swimmers
Italian female long-distance swimmers
Swimmers of Fiamme Oro
Mediterranean Games silver medalists for Italy
Mediterranean Games medalists in swimming
Swimmers at the 2013 Mediterranean Games
Medalists at the 2013 Summer Universiade
Universiade silver medalists for Italy
Universiade medalists in swimming
21st-century Italian women